Peter Louis Tucker (1927-2017), was a notable Sherbro civil servant and he was once the Chief Executive for the Commission for Racial Equality in the United Kingdom a position he had from 1976 to 1982.

Career
Peter Tucker was the Chairman of the Law Reform Commission - a position he has held since 2003.

Family
Peter Tucker was a member of the aristocratic Sherbro Tucker family of Sierra Leone and his niece was Patricia Kabbah, that country's one time first lady.

Resources

 https://web.archive.org/web/20070930183555/http://people.africadatabase.org/en/person/17002.html

Sherbro people
Commissioners for Racial Equality
1927 births
2017 deaths
Alumni of the University of Oxford
Alumni of Jesus College, Oxford